Umbra railway station served the Umbra nature reserve near Downhill in County Londonderry, Northern Ireland.

The Londonderry and Coleraine Railway opened the station in 1855.

It served only as a request stop for its short lifetime, and closed in 1861.

Routes

References

Disused railway stations in County Londonderry
Railway stations opened in 1855
Railway stations closed in 1861
1855 establishments in Ireland
Railway stations in Northern Ireland opened in the 19th century